Gloria Tang Sze-wing (born 16 August 1991), professionally known as G.E.M. (backronym of Get Everybody Moving) or Tang Tsz-kei, is a Hong Kong singer-songwriter originally from Shanghai, China. She made her debut in the Hong Kong music industry in 2008. After releasing three albums in Hong Kong, her appearance in the 2014 edition of Chinese singing competition program I Am a Singer 2 and subsequent 2nd-place finish gained her immense fame and popularity in Greater China.

In 2015, she released her first full Mandopop album Heartbeat. The following year, she became the only Asian artist featured in the Forbes 30 Under 30. She is the first female Chinese singer to have four music videos that exceed 100 million views on YouTube.

Early life 
Tang Sze-wing was born on 16 August 1991, in Shanghai, China; she was given the English name Gloria by her father. Her father is from Hong Kong, and her mother is from Shanghai. She has a younger sister, four years younger than her. G.E.M. spent her childhood at Caoyang New Village and lived with her maternal grandmother who died in March 2011. She moved to Hong Kong with her parents at the age of four. She attended Christian schools for her education.

G.E.M. grew up with a musical background, her mother from Vocal Music department of Shanghai Conservatory of Music, her grandmother was a vocal coach, her grandfather was a saxophonist in an orchestra, and her uncle was a violinist. G.E.M. started to write songs at the age of five. She would play a few practice songs and improvise them herself. She was featured in a performance on Hong Kong's Educational Television at the age of seven. She achieved ABRSM's piano grade 8 at the age of thirteen. G.E.M. names Christina Aguilera, Beyoncé, and Mariah Carey as her influences.

In 2006, G.E.M. won the champion in the singing competition titled Spice It Up, and caught the attention of Chang Tan (張丹), who offered her a recording deal with Hummingbird Music. She then became a professional singer at the age of 16. She graduated from Heep Woh Primary School and True Light Girls' College with a score of 21 points in HKCEE. In 2008, she attended Hong Kong Academy for Performing Arts, but dropped out in 2009 due to her decision to focus on her singing career.

Career

2008–2010: G.E.M., 18..., and My Secret 

In October 2008, G.E.M. released her debut self-titled EP G.E.M. which included two Mandarin songs and three Cantonese songs. She won a series of awards for the album, and was dubbed the "Girl with Giant Lungs" and "Young Diva with Giant Lungs" for her vocal range. In May 2009, G.E.M. travelled to Los Angeles to record her first studio album, 18..., which was released in October 2009. In November 2009, she held her first concert G.E.M. 18 Live 2009 at Hong Kong International Trade and Exhibition Centre, and the concert featured special guests including Jan Lamb and Justin Lo. In the same year, she also held a concert in Toronto. In 2010, G.E.M. went to Taiwan to promote the album 18... and then returned to Los Angeles to record her next studio album, My Secret, which was released in October 2010.

2011–2012: Get Everybody Moving Tour and Xposed 
In May 2011, G.E.M. performed a three-day concerts titled Get Everybody Moving Tour in Hong Kong Coliseum, and became the youngest Hong Kong female artist to perform in the venue. She then performed another five concerts in the same venue in September and embarked a concert tour in eight countries.

In June 2012, she performed alongside Jason Mraz and Khalil Fong at the iTunes Live in Hong Kong, and sang "Lucky" with Jason Mraz. Her third studio album, Xposed, was released in July 2012. The lead single, "What Have U Done", peaked number one on all four pop music charts in Hong Kong.

2013–2015: X.X.X. Live Tour, I Am a Singer, and Heartbeat 
G.E.M. embarked on her X.X.X. Live World Tour in April 2013, in support of her third studio album, Xposed. The tour started with five shows in Hong Kong Coliseum, and ended with a show at Wembley Arena in London, which is also her debut show in Europe. There was a total of 73 shows in 4 continents. In May, she became the youngest nominee ever of Golden Melody Award for Best Female Vocalist Mandarin, with her album Xposed. In June, she released a cover of Chinese smash hit Intoxicated, which was played for 15 million times on QQ Music within a week.

In January 2014, she appeared in the second season of Hunan TV's I Am a Singer alongside Han Lei, Zhou Bichang, Phil Chang, Gary Chaw and others. Her second-place finish gained her immense popularity and fame in Greater China. In the same year, she earned a World Music Award nomination for World's Best Female Artist and an MTV Europe Music Award nomination for Best Mainland China & Hong Kong Act. In December 2014, G.E.M.'s wax figure at Madame Tussauds Hong Kong was unveiled. On 10 February 2015, JJ Lin published the official music video for his song "Beautiful" featuring G.E.M.. In September 2015, she was selected to be the team advisor for team Wang Feng at The Voice of China 4. In November 2015, she appeared on the cover of China's Apple Music, and released her studio album Heartbeat with music videos of all ten tracks in the album. The album topped the iTunes chart in China.

2016–2018: G-Force and Queen of Hearts Tour 
In 2016, she appeared on the list of Forbes 30 Under 30 (Music), being the only Asian musician on the list. In the same year, she was asked to voice a lead role in the animated film Charming, alongside Demi Lovato, Ashley Tisdale, and Avril Lavigne. She also performed at Heroes of Remix that same year, singing EDM versions of songs such as "Like You" and "The Brightest Star In The Night Sky", among others. In September 2016, she released her photobook 25 Looks and an EP, which includes four remix songs. In November 2016, she earned an MTV Europe Music Award for Best Mainland China & Hong Kong Act. On 29 December 2016, G.E.M. released the Chinese theme song for the science fiction film Passengers titled "Light Years Away", which she also performed on several occasions, including NASA 2019 Breakthrough Prize. Lyrically, similar to the plot of the film itself, it speaks of a doomed love.

In May 2017, G.E.M released her first documentary G-Force, which was directed by Nick Wickham. In April 2017, she embarked on her Queen of Hearts World Tour. On 21 October 2017, Chinese-Malaysian hip hop artist Namewee published a video featuring her in a cover of his song "Stranger In The North (KTV Version)", which had received widespread popularity, where she sings the chorus which was originally performed by Taiwanese-American singer-songwriter Wang Leehom. At the 13th Annual KKBox Music Awards on 21 January 2018, G.E.M. and Namewee together sang "Stranger In The North" immediately after she sang "Goodbye" and "Light Years Away" for her 2018 KKBox Artist of the Year award-winner performance. On April, she was invited to be the duet partner for Hua Chenyu in the finals of Singer 2018 and sang "Light Years Away".

On 18 August 2018, her Queen of Hearts World Tour has called for an end for part 1 of the tour and she announced the part 2 tour will hold in 2019 with more new songs.

2018–2021: "Fairytale Trilogy" project, Queen of Hearts Tour Part 2, and City Zoo 

In 2018, G.E.M announced that she would be working on a project, Fairytale Trilogy, where each of the three EP's will feature three new songs written by herself, and produced by Lupo Groinig. The first EP, My Fairytale, with the lead single "Tik Tok" was released digitally on Chinese streaming platforms on 16 August and officially released worldwide on the 30th. On 4 November, G.E.M. was invited to perform the song "Light Years Away" and served as on-stage presenter in the Breakthrough Prize, being the first ever Chinese singer to perform at the ceremony. On 19 November, she was selected as one of the BBC 100 Women, being the only Chinese on the list. On 22 November, the number of subscribers of her official YouTube channel "GEMblog" exceeded 1 million. On 26 October, the second EP, Fearless, with the single "Woke", was released digitally on Chinese streaming platforms and worldwide on 9 November. On 14 December, the third and final EP from the project, Queen G, with the lead single "Love Finds a Way", was released on Chinese streaming platforms and worldwide on 28 December. After gaining some more new commercial endorsements, G.E.M. composed and recorded new commercial songs in Los Angeles in early 2019.  Then beginning March 2019, she resumed her Queen of Hearts World Tour with concerts across Canada, US and Eastern Asia.

On 3 May 2019, G.E.M. released her sixth and last studio album with Hummingbird, Happily Ever After, which is a compilation of three EPs she released in late 2018 as part of the Fairytale Trilogy. G.E.M. released her seventh studio album City Zoo on 27 December 2019. Following, she appeared on the Bilibili New Year's Eve event and Jiangsu TV's New Year's Eve event simultaneously on 31 December 2019, performing her hit singles Light Years Away, Tik Tok and Full Stop.

On 3 January 2020, G.E.M. was invited to host by Taiwanese singer Jolin Tsai fifth concert tour Ugly Beauty World Tour at Taipei Arena in Taipei. They are singing "Say Love You" and "Light Years Away" with each other.

On February 2021, G.E.M. released new single "Parallel". On November 2021, G.E.M. released new single "Double You".

2022–present: Revelation 

On July 16, 2022, G.E.M. announced her new album Revelation would be released soon. The 14-track album is to be released by Warner Music China. "Gloria", the first single from the album, was released on August 9, 2022. G.E.M. spoke of the inspiration behind Revelation. On December 8, 2022, G.E.M. released her single "Wallfacer".

Personal life 
G.E.M. is a devout Christian and several of her songs reflect Christian themes, including Gloria, Heartbeat, and Walk on Water. Her Revelation album is inspired by a "supernatural experience she encountered." She has stated that her field has been stressful, but that it has been "her faith in God that kept her through the hardships of her career and allowed her to grow in trials."

Contractual issues and lawsuit 
On 7 March 2019, she announced that she would no longer be represented by Hummingbird after three months of negotiations on her contract and allegedly being pressured to work. Hummingbird replied saying that there was no such pressure or unfair practices. G.E.M. continued on The Queen of Hearts World Tour until April 2019 so as not to disappoint her fans. As "G.E.M." and "Tang Tsz-kei" are trademarks held by Hummingbird, it was speculated that she may have to give up using the stage name. However Hummingbird explained that the copyright was to prevent piracy, and a lawyer is being consulted before an appropriate course of action is carried out. A spokesperson added that "a lawyer has been assigned to make sure that [she] will receive all the basic rights that she deserves".

On 29 March 2019, Hummingbird filed a court case claiming that G.E.M. has three more years on her contract, ending in 2022, and is looking to validate the contracts signed in 2014, with no start date indicated on the documents, as to be taken in effect only in March 2017. Should their case succeed and she leaves the company, she may have to pay  (approximately million) as compensation for losses. G.E.M. maintained that the 2014 contract was signed under the pressure of not being able to participate in the finals of I Am a Singer if she did not sign the contract. G.E.M. had since filed a counter-suit for unspecified damages, claiming that the company had failed in fulfilling their contractual duties. Both parties seek exclusive rights to her copyrighted works, including the stage name.

On a Shende Wisdom Talents episode aired on 27 October 2020, G.E.M. alleged that she had suffered "mental abuse" at Hummingbird.

Discography 

 18... (2009)
 My Secret (2010)
 Xposed (2012)
 Heartbeat (2015)
 Happily Ever After (2019)
 City Zoo (2019)
 Revelation (2022)

Filmography

Feature films

Music video

Short film

Variety shows

Tours 

 Get Everybody Moving Concert (2011–2012)
 X.X.X. Live Tour (2013–2015)
 Queen of Hearts World Tour (2017–2019)

Awards

References

External links 

 
 
 
 
 

1991 births
Living people
21st-century Hong Kong actresses
21st-century Hong Kong women singers
21st-century pianists
21st-century violinists
21st-century women pianists
Alumni of The Hong Kong Academy for Performing Arts
BBC 100 Women
Cantopop singers
English-language singers from Hong Kong
Hong Kong Christians
Hong Kong film actresses
Hong Kong Mandopop singers
Hong Kong pianists
Hong Kong singer-songwriters
Hong Kong television actresses
Jazz pianists
Jazz violinists
Mandopop musicians
MTV Europe Music Award winners
The Amazing Race contestants